Czechoslovakia sent 82 athletes to the 1978 European Athletics Championships which took place 29 August–3 September 1978 in Prague. Czechoslovakia won five medals at the Championships.

Medalists

References 

Nations at the 1978 European Athletics Championships
Czechoslovakia at the European Athletics Championships
1978 in Czechoslovakia